Antonio Corro (c. 1790 – c. 1855) was one of two interim mayors of Ponce, Puerto Rico, after the death of mayor Salvador de Vives on 24 November 1845. Corro was interim mayor as well as José Zaldo during 1845. Corro served first, followed by Zaldo. He then also served as mayor during the first three months of 1846.

First mayoral term
Corro served as interim mayor of Ponce starting on 25 November 1845 upon the death-while-in-office of Salvador de Vives, and served until around 30 November 1845 when José Zaldo took Corro's place as interim mayor.

Second mayoral term
After José Zaldo had served as interim mayor until 31 December 1846, Antonio Corro again became the interim mayor on 1 January 1846 and served until 31 March 1846, when José Ortíz de la Renta became mayor.

See also

 List of Puerto Ricans
 List of mayors of Ponce, Puerto Rico

Notes

References

Mayors of Ponce, Puerto Rico
1790s births
1850s deaths
Year of birth uncertain
Year of death uncertain